"Louisiana Man" is a song originally written and recorded by American country artist Doug Kershaw in 1961.  It peaked at #10 that year on the Billboard Hot Country Singles chart when Kershaw and his brother released it as Rusty and Doug.

In 1970 American country music artist Connie Smith reached #14 with a cover version. The single spawned the release of her 1970 studio album I Never Once Stopped Loving You, on which the song was included.

The song was recorded as a single by Jan & Dean in 1966 and was planned to be released on their album Carnival of Sound in 1968. That was not released until 2010. Other versions were recorded as an album track that year by The Seekers, Rick Nelson, and Gene Pitney. Bobbie Gentry covered the song on a 1968 single. Harpers Bizarre recorded it on their 1967 album Anything Goes. It was also recorded by The Hollies.

The song is repeatedly mentioned in the chorus of the Alabama song "If You're Gonna Play in Texas (You Gotta Have a Fiddle in the Band)".

References

1961 singles
Rusty and Doug songs
Doug Kershaw songs
1970 singles
Connie Smith songs
Song recordings produced by Bob Ferguson (musician)
Jan and Dean songs